In Spain, Míchel (stressed on the first syllable) is a common nickname for Miguel, particularly frequent in footballers. Spanish footballers known as Míchel include:

Míchel (footballer, born 1963), real name José Miguel González Martín del Campo, former Spanish football midfielder and coach, and allegedly the one who popularized the nickname
Míchel (footballer, born 1975), real name Miguel Ángel Sánchez Muñoz, Spanish former football midfielder 
Míchel (footballer, born 1977), real name Miguel Ángel Carrilero, Spanish former football forward
Míchel (footballer, born 1985), real name Miguel Marcos Madera, Spanish football midfielder
Míchel (footballer, born 1988), Miguel Alfonso Herrero, Spanish football midfielder
Michel (footballer, born 2001), Michel Costa da Silva, Brazilian football midfielder
Míchel Salgado (born 1975), real name Miguel Ángel Salgado Fernández, Spanish former football defender
Míchel Zabaco (born 1989), real name Miguel Zabaco Tomé, Spanish football defender
Carlos Michel Lopes Vargas (born 1982), known as just Michel , Brazilian footballer

See also

Lists of people by nickname